Archips mertias is a species of moth of the family Tortricidae. It is found in Himachal Pradesh, India.

References

Moths described in 2004
Archips
Moths of Asia